Medellín Airport can refer to:
José María Córdova International Airport
Enrique Olaya Herrera Airport